Wang Zhifeng (born 1 February 1997) is a Chinese footballer currently playing as a goalkeeper for Wuhan Zall.

Club career
Wang Zhifeng would make his senior debut for Wuhan Zall in a league game on 1 August 2020 against Beijing Sinobo Guoan F.C. where he came on as a substitute for Dong Chunyu in a match that ended in a 1-0 defeat.

Career statistics

References

External links

1997 births
Living people
Chinese footballers
Association football goalkeepers
Chinese Super League players
Wuhan F.C. players